Roman is a rural locality (a selo), and one of two settlements in Sen-Kyuyolsky Rural Okrug of Srednekolymsky District in the Sakha Republic, Russia, in addition to Oyusardakh, the administrative center of the Rural Okrug. Its population as of the 2010 Census was 0; the same as recorded during the 2002 Census.

References

Notes

Sources
Official website of the Sakha Republic. Registry of the Administrative-Territorial Divisions of the Sakha Republic. Srednekolymsky District. 

Rural localities in Srednekolymsky District